The Queensland National Bank is a former bank in Queensland, Australia.

History
In 1872, the bank was established in Brisbane.

In December 1914, the bank had its head office in Brisbane with branches throughout Queensland at Allora, Aramac, Ayr, Barcaldine, Beaudesert, Biggenden, Blackall, Boonah, Bundaberg, Burketown, Cairns (with a receiving office at Gordonvale), Charleville, Charters Towers, Childers (with a receiving office at Cordalba), Clifton, Cloncurry, Cooktown, Crows Nest, Cunnamulla, Dalby (with receiving offices at Bell and Tara), Esk, Forest Hill, Fortitude Valley, Gatton (with receiving office at Grantham), Gladstone, Goombungee, Goondiwindi, Greenmount, Gympie, Halifax, Herberton, Hughenden, Ingham, Innsifail, Ipswich, Invinebank, Jandowae, Kandanga, Killarney, Kingaroy, Laidley, Longreach, Mackay, Marburg, Mareeba, Maryborough, Millmerran, Mitchell (with receiving office at Mungallala), Mount Morgan, Murgon, Muttaburra, Nobby, Normanton, Oakey (with receiving offices at Jondaryan and Kingsthorpe), Pittsworth, Port Douglas, Ravenswood, Richmond, Rockhampton, Roma, Rosewood, Sarina, South Brisbane, Southbrook, St George, Tambo, Tannymorel, Thursday Island, Tingoora, Toogoolawah, Toowoomba, Townsville, Wahoon, Warra (with a receiving office at Brigalow), Warwick, Winton, Wondai, Wooroolin (with a receiving office at Memerambi), Yangan and Yarraman. It also had branches in London, Melbourne and Sydney and a network of agents in other countries.

The first general manager was Edward Robert Drury 1872–1896, succeeded by Walter Vardon Ralston 1898–1920.

In 1948, the bank was taken over by the National Bank of Australasia.

Legacy 
The bank constructed many substantial and ornate buildings as branches throughout Queensland. A number of extant buildings are heritage-listed, including:
 Queensland National Bank, Brisbane CBD (head office)
 Queensland National Bank, Childers
 Queensland National Bank, Cooktown
 Queensland National Bank, Forest Hill
 Queensland National Bank, Gympie
 Queensland National Bank, Ipswich
 Queensland National Bank, Maryborough
 Queensland National Bank, Rockhampton
 Queensland National Bank, South Brisbane
 Queensland National Bank, Townsville.
The locality of Qunaba takes its name from the Qunaba sugar mill, being in turn coined from the bank's name (QUeensland NAtional BAnk).

Queensland National Bank was inducted into the Queensland Business Leaders Hall of Fame in 2011, for their significant contribution to Queensland's early economic development.

References

External links 

 
 Queensland National Bank digital story and oral histories: Queensland Business Leaders Hall of Fame 2011, State Library of Queensland

 
Defunct banks of Australia
Banks established in 1872
1872 establishments in Australia
Banks disestablished in 1948
1948 disestablishments in Australia
National Australia Bank